Tapete Records is an independent record label based in  Hamburg, Germany.

It was founded in 2002 by Gunther Buskies and Dirk Darmstaedter and primarily focused on Deutschpop Bands such as Erdmöbel, Niels Frevert, Tele and Anajo. Since 2005 Tapete Records also attends to international acts, for example from the US, Great Britain, Australia and Sweden. They include Lloyd Cole, The Monochrome Set, The Telescopes, The Lilac Time, Robert Forster, Stereo Total, The Catenary Wires, Andreas Dorau, Bobby Conn, The Proper Ornaments, Pete Astor, Hellsongs, Lacrosse, Gary Olson, Bambi Kino, Christian Kjellvander, John Howard & The Night Mail, Last Days Of April and many more.
So far, Tapete Records has put out more than 500 releases (as of November 2015).
Tapete Records is internationally distributed by various distribution partners.

Tapete Records also contains the publishing company Tapete Songs and booking agency Howdy Partner Booking (former Tapete Booking). Tapete Songs features more than 6,000 published copyrights. Some of them were used in TV shows in the USA ( Better Call Saul, Chuck, Homeland), England (Skins)  and Canada (Degrassi). Howdy Partner Booking promotes Tapete Records bands as well as bands from other labels, having a total of more than 70 artists in its repertoire (e.g. Bobby Conn, Bill Pritchard, The Proper Ornaments, Pete Astor, The Late Call, Robert Forster, John Howard & The Night Mail and more).

In 2005 Bureau B, a label for electronic, free spirited music, was added to Tapete Records roster.

Artists

 1000 Robota*
 A Projection
 Anajo
 Bambi Kino
 Bart Davenport
 Benjamin Dean Wilson
 Bernd Begemann & Die Befreiung
 Bill Pritchard
 Boy Omega
 Brace/Choir
 Chaplin
 Christian Kjellvander
 Clara Hill
 Darlo*
 Desiree Klaeukens
 Dial M for Murder!
 Die Höchste Eisenbahn
 Die Liga der gewöhnlichen Gentlemen
 Die Sonne
 Die Zimmermänner
 Dirk Darmstaedter´s Me And Cassity*
 Downpilot
 Dutch Uncles*
 Ecke Schönhauser
 Eight Rounds Rapid
 Erdmöbel*
 Ezio
 Fehlfarben
 Francesco Wilking
Nick Garrie
 Geschmeido*
 Hero & Leander
 Herpes
 Hellsongs
 HGich.T
 Hurricane No. 1
 Jack Beauregard
 Jean Poly*
 John Howard & The Night Mail
 Josh Ottum
 Junior High
 Kolkhorst*
 Kristofer Åström
 Lacrosse
 LAKE
 Last Days Of April
 Lloyd Cole
 Maplewood
 Marcel Gein
 Martin Carr
 Men Among Animals
 Mobylettes
 Montag*
 Moritz Krämer
 Naked Lunch
 Neo Rodeo
 Next Stop: Horizon
 Nick Nicely
 Niels Frevert*
 Nom de Guerre
  Now, Now Every Children*
Oliver Gottwald
 Paul Dimmer Band*
 Pollens
 Rantanplan*
 Robert Forster 
 Saal 2
 Salim Nourallah
 Samba
 Schrottgrenze
 Schwefelgelb
 Simon Love
 Superpunk
 Tele
 Tess Wiley*
 The Elephants*
 The Grand Opening
 The Horror The Horror
 The Late Call
 The Lilac Time
 The Monochrome Set
 The Soft Hills
 The Telescopes
 Wolke

The artists with * are former artists

Hanse Song Festival
The Hanse Song Festival (organized by Tapete Records) took place for the first time in 2012. It is based in Stade, a town close to Hamburg which is famous for its historic city. It is a small festival with several folk and pop musicians performing in special and beautiful locations in the city center such as the town hall ( Königsmarcksaal), the court, the museum "Schwedenspeicher", Seminarturnhalle, St. Wilhadi-Kirche and more. In the first year nine artists performed on three different stages. Since then the numbers has risen to 18 artists, playing six different locations at the fourth Hanse Song Festival in March 2015. The Hanse Song Festival 2015 started with a musical reading by Rocko Schamoni und Tex M. Strzoda the day before the actual festival.
Bands and artists that have played the Hanse Song Festival so far are, amongst others, Lloyd Cole (UK), Olli Schulz (D), Niels Frevert (D), Ezio (UK), ClickClickDecker (D), Luka Bloom (IRL), Bernd Begemann & Die Befreiung (D), Die Höchste Eisenbahn (D), Cäthe (D), Christian Kjellvander (SWE), Tim Neuhaus (D), Pohlmann (D), Hellsongs (SWE), Kat Frankie (AUS),  Jan Plewka (D), Fotos (D), The Grand Opening (SWE), The Soft Hills (USA), and many more.

Müssen Alle Mit Festival (MAMF)
The Müssen Alle Mit festival is an annual festival which takes place in Stade, Germany, every summer. It took place for the first time in 2013 and is organized by Tapete Records in association with the city of Stade. Müssen Alle Mit is a one-day open-air festival drawing around 2,000 visitors each year. The style of music reaches from rock and punk to indie pop and hip-hop. A special offer is the „Tour de MAMF“, a bicycle tour from Hamburg-Finkenwerder to Stade organised by "KonzertKulTour". It includes breakfast with jam and Mett and a reception with sparkling wine once the destination has been reached.

Line Up 2015: Nada Surf (US), Antilopen Gang (D), Käptn Peng & Die Tentakel von Delphi (D), Egotronic (D), Schrottgrenze (D), Rhonda (D), Oliver Gottwald (D), host: Friedemann Weise

Line Up 2014: Thees Uhlmann & Band (D), William Fitzsimmons (US), Die Höchste Eisenbahn (D), Mozes And The Firstborn (NL), Bernd Begemann & Die Befreiung (D), Brace/Choir (US/D), Soda Fabric (ISR), host: Bernd Begemann

Line Up 2013: Kettcar (D), Die Liga der gewöhnlichen Gentlemen (D), Me and my Drummer (D), Naked Lunch (D), Turbostaat (D), Tusq (D), host: Carsten Friedrichs

See also
 List of record labels

References

External links
 Official site
 Youtube Channel
 Tapete Records on Discogs
 Hanse Song Festival
 Müssen alle mit Festival MAMF

German independent record labels
Record labels established in 2002
Pop record labels
2002 establishments in Germany